is a railway station in the northeastern part of city of Nagano, Japan, in area called . The station  is operated by the private railway operating company .

The station serves the University of Nagano (長野県立大学 Nagano Kenritsu Daigaku), Nagano Women's Junior College (長野女子短期大学 Nagano joshi tanki daigaku), Nagano School for the Deaf (長野県長野ろう学校 Naganoken Nagano rou gakkou), Nagano Prefectural, Nagano Senior High School (長野県長野高等学校 Naganoken Nagano koutou gakkou), and Nagano Girls Senior High School (長野女子高等学校 Nagano joshi koutou gakkou).

Lines
Hongō Station is a station on the Nagano Electric Railway Nagano Line.

Between Hongo Station and Zenkōjishita Station, the train descends underground for the last 2.5 kilometers to Nagano Station. This underground section of the line was completed in 1981.

Station layout
The station is a staffed station. The station consists of two opposed side platforms serving two tracks, with an elevated station building. There were two stairways to enter the elevated station building where the ticket gate was located. Beginning in November 2019, construction began to install the ticket gate at the ground level. Currently (January 2020), passengers enter on the ground level on the Yudanaka-bound platform.

Passengers arriving at the station show their tickets. Departing passengers do not need to show their tickets. The station does not have an automatic ticket gate.

A small selection of seasonal agricultural products are available for sale inside the ticket gate.

Platforms

Adjacent stations

History
 The station opened on 28 June 1926.
 October, 1968, construction to enlarge the station began.
 March 29, 1969, the current station was completed. It included a small store, "Hongo Station Department". The new station was 31 times larger than the previous station.

Passenger statistics
In fiscal 2017, the station was used by an average of 1379 passengers daily (boarding passengers only).

Scheduled Bus Service
Nagaden Bus 12 which runs from Nagano Station to Mure Station on the Kita-Shinano Line in Iizuna, Nagano stops in front of the station at Hongo "Station Bus Stop".

Surrounding area

Universities and colleges

 The  - a 4-year public co-educational university 
 The

Schools

Shrines
 , one of the seven shrines of Zenkō-ji, is in front of Hongō Station.

 , founded in 807

Businesses
 , a supermarket chain based in Nagano Prefecture, is located 500m to the south of the station.
  is to the north of the station.
  is to the north of the station.
 , a Japanese DIY chain, is located 1.1 kilometers southeast of the station.

Other
  is a 25-minute walk from Hongō Station, near 
  
  is 1.4 km west of Hongō Station.
  is 1.5 km west of Hongō Station.

Gallery

See also
 List of railway stations in Japan

References

External links
 

Railway stations in Japan opened in 1926
Railway stations in Nagano (city)
Nagano Electric Railway